Charles Gilmore may refer to:

 Charles W. Gilmore (1874–1945), American paleontologist
 Charles Gilmore (speed skater) (born 1950), American speed skater

See also 
 Charles Gilmour (disambiguation)